Graham Hunt (born 7 December 1953) is an Australian former professional darts player who competed by the events of the World Darts Federation (WDF). He won the 1997 Winmau World Masters. He played formerly in the British Darts Organisation (BDO) tournaments.

Darts Career
Hunt played in the 1997 BDO World Darts Championship, losing in the first round to Mervyn King. He then produced a run months later in the Winmau World Masters. He beat former Masters champion Erik Clarys in the first round and then exacted revenge on King in the second round. He then beat fellow countryman Peter Hinkley and Les Delderfield before beating Ronnie Baxter in the final to clinch the title. At age 43, Hunt was also the oldest man to win the Masters title, until Martin Adams won the title in 2008, aged 52.

Despite his Masters win, Hunt never managed to fulfill his potential. He did not play in the World Championship or the Masters in 1998, but did win the Australian Masters. He played in the 1999 World Championship though, beating Andy Jenkins in the first round before losing to England captain Adams in the second round. He returned a year later, losing in round one to 1996 World Champion Steve Beaton. It was his last appearance at the Lakeside.

He finally returned to the World Masters in 2002, losing in the last 64 stage to Simon Whatley. Since then, he has played in Australia and New Zealand as well as the WDF World Cup in 2005. His last appearance was at the 2006 Pacific Masters, losing at the last 16 before quietly disappearing from the sport.

Hunt Quit the BDO in October 2019.

World Championship results

BDO

 1997: 1st round (lost to Mervyn King 1–3) (sets) 
 1999: 2nd round (lost to Martin Adams 1–3)
 2000: 1st round (lost to Steve Beaton 0–3)

External links
Graham Hunt's profile and stats on Darts Database

Australian darts players
Living people
1953 births
Sportspeople from Melbourne
Sportspeople from Perth, Western Australia
Place of birth missing (living people)
British Darts Organisation players